Tout va bien is a 1972 French-Italian political drama film directed by Jean-Luc Godard and collaborator Jean-Pierre Gorin and starring Jane Fonda and Yves Montand.

The film's title means "everything is going well". It was released in the United States under the title All's Well and internationally under the title Just Great.

The Godard/Gorin collaboration continued with the featurette Letter to Jane as a postscript to Tout va bien.

Overview
The film centers on a strike at a sausage factory which is witnessed by an American reporter and her French husband, who is a director of TV commercials. The film has a strong political message which outlines the logic of the class struggle in France in the wake of the May 1968 civil unrest. It also examines the social destruction caused by capitalism. The performers in Tout va bien employ the Brechtian technique of distancing themselves from the audience. By delivering an opaque performance, the actors draw the audience away from the film's diegesis and towards broader inferences about the film's meaning.

The factory set consists of a cross-sectioned building and allows the camera to dolly back and forth from room to room, theoretically through the walls. Another self-reflexive technique, this particular set was used because it forces the audience to remember that they are witnessing a film, breaking the fourth wall in a literal sense. This type of staging was appropriated from Jerry Lewis's film The Ladies Man. Godard and Gorin use other self-reflexive techniques in Tout va bien such as direct camera address, long takes, and abandonment of the continuity editing system.

References

External links

 
Tout va bien Revisited an essay by J. Hoberman at the Criterion Collection

French avant-garde and experimental films
1972 films
Films about anarchism
1970s French-language films
French political drama films
Films directed by Jean-Luc Godard
Films about the labor movement
Films about labor relations
1970s political drama films
Films set in factories
1970s avant-garde and experimental films
1972 drama films
1970s French films